The West Indies cricket team toured Zimbabwe in October and November 2017 to play two Tests matches for the Clive Lloyd Trophy. The teams last played a Test match against each other in March 2013. Ahead of the Test series, the two teams also played a three-day warm-up fixture. The series marked the international comebacks of Brendan Taylor and Kyle Jarvis, after their resignation from their Kolpak deals. West Indies won the series 1–0, after the final match finished in a draw. It was the first Test series win for the West Indies with Jason Holder as captain, and the first time that Zimbabwe had drawn a Test match since playing Bangladesh in January 2005.

Squads

Tour match

Three-day match: Zimbabwe A v West Indies

Test series

1st Test

2nd Test

Notes

References

External links
 Series home at ESPN Cricinfo

2017 in West Indian cricket
2017 in Zimbabwean cricket
International cricket competitions in 2017–18
West Indian cricket tours of Zimbabwe